Erin Christine Alexander (born April 25, 1975) is an American retired basketball player. Alexanders played one season in the Women's National Basketball Association (WNBA), splitting it between the Los Angeles Sparks for 12 games and the Utah Starzz for 8 during the 1998 WNBA season. During her time in the league, she averaged 2 points over 7.1 minutes over 20 games.

Aldridge attended University of California, Santa Barbara, where she played with the Gauchos. She graduated from UCSB in 1998.

References

1975 births
Living people
American women's basketball players
Basketball players from California
Point guards
Los Angeles Sparks players
People from Santa Barbara County, California
Shooting guards
UC Santa Barbara Gauchos women's basketball players
Utah Starzz players